Thomas Lucy (1532–1600) was an English politician.

Thomas Lucy may also refer to:
Thomas Lucy (died 1415), MP for Warwickshire
Thomas Lucy (died 1640) (1585–1640), landowner and MP for Warwickshire and Warwick
Tom Lucy (born 1988), British rower
Tom Lucy (comedian) (born 1996), British stand-up comedian